Weesperplein is an underground metro station in the city centre of Amsterdam, Netherlands. The station has two floors: an upper station hall with stores and the lower floor with the tracks. The first metro train rolled into it in January 1977. Extensive tests were carried out in September before the station opened on 16 October.

The repairs conducted during a renovation in 2011 were of poor quality and had to be redone. The station was renovated again during 2017 and 2018. A new elevator and two additional staircases between the hall and tracks were constructed. It was the fifth most used station of the Amsterdam Metro in 2018.

An additional platform below the existing one was also built for a potential East–West line, but was used as a fallout shelter with the capacity of 5,000 people when the line was cancelled in 1975. The shelter wasn't maintained from 1999 onwards and equipment was removed in 2004 to make way for smoke extraction machinery.

Layout 
Weesperplein station is located under Weesperstraat and consists of two underground levels. The top level has eight enterances from the streets and includes the paygates of the metro system and some stores such as an Albert Heijn To Go and a sandwich shop. The level below is where the metro tracks are located and has two side platforms. While all other metro stations on the East Line have an island platform, an exception was made for Weesperplein as it was suppossed to be the station where two lines would intersect each other. This also resulted in a larger station hall. In addition, Weesperplein is the only station to have a third reserve track. In 2018, greenery was placed outside the enterences of the station, replacing bicycle parking racks.

Ghost station and shelter 

In Weesperplein, planners had to take an additional East to West line into account. An extra area for a platform below the one used by East Line was created, which consisted of large open areas made out of concrete. When all lines apart from the East Line, including the East–West line, were cancelled by the municipality on 19 March 1975, the area was used as a fallout shelter. The whole station has a capacity to house up to 12,000 people, 5,000 of which inside the shelter.

The shelter included beds, watertanks and garbage chutes for radioactive clothing. There are showering areas at the very bottom with bulkheads, but the shower heads and disposal systems were removed later. The doors are waterproof and tested every year to make sure they work. Public shelters in Amsterdam, including the shelter at Weesperplein, weren't maintained from 1999 onwards. In 2004, the equipments were removed to make way for smoke extraction machinery in case of a fire. The former shelter can be accessed via sliding doors at the top level of station.

History

Construction 

Weesperplein was the first station to start being constructed, with work commencing in August 1970. It was expected to take "4 to 5 years" to finish the station. Most underground areas of the East Line were constructed by using caissons, which made pumping out groundwater unnecessary. The earth below the cassions were rinsed with water and pumped out, lowering them into their place. There were protests against the construction of the metro, as this method required the demolition of the houses above the line.

The station was reported to be almost completed by June 1974. During the digging process of the station, two former freshwater storage basements were found. Inside the Singelgracht are 33 of such basements, but not much is known of them as they are not in use.

Opening and early years 

A metro was first rolled into the underground tunnels on 25 January 1977. The section from Weesperplein to Amsterdam Centraal was not finished yet. Prior to public opening, journalists and members of the municipality council were given a ride from Amsterdam Amstel to Weesperplein. The regular metro operations were tested with 100 personnel in September 1977. The metro line, and Weesperplein with it, opened to the public on 16 October. For the first three years, units that came into the Weesperplein were put onto the other track with a switch that was located just after the station to run the other direction to Bijlmermeer. The section towards Centraal station was opened later on 11 October 1980.

Braille patterns were installed on the handrails at the station in 1984 to assist blind and visually impaired people. On 12 July 1999, a high-speed tram of line 51 caught fire at the Weesperplein station due to a blocked disc brake. The tram was carrying no passengers at the time. The smoke caused all levels of the station to be evacuated. Two people were taken to the hospital for smoke inhalation, but were discharged quickly after their condition was determined to be minor.

2010s 
In 2011, during a renovation, asbestos was found in one of the emergency stairs of the station. The quality of the repairs was found to have "fallen short [of standards]" and had to be redone several times. The asbestos caused delays in metro operations for two months. In 2014, an exact copy of the station was reconstructed in Vught, North Brabant, to allow police, first aid, firefighting and military personnel to train on emergency situations. In April 2017, the Gemeente Vervoerbedrijf started to play music through the speakers of underground metro stations as a test. The type of music would depend on the time of day: slow and calming music during rush hours, and energetic music during the afternoon.

A renovation of the station started in May 2017 with one of the entrances. The renovation was split into five phases to allow the station to be kept open, with each phase taking three to four months. Concrete was replaced with glass to make it spacious, lighter and clearer. A new elevator from the hall to the platforms was constructed, while the three existing ones were renovated. Two new staircases to the tracks were also built. Supply of new and disposal of old materials was done at night, when the Amsterdam Metro doesn't run, by using the rails, to prevent congestion of the roads with trucks. As the payment gates located before the stairs from the hall to the platform frequently caused congestion on the platform due to passengers not being able to leave quickly, they were moved to the actual station entrances, creating one large central hall. Walls were given smooth curves to "guide" passengers.

Writing for Het Parool, Marc Kruyswijk said that the station prior to its restorations was a place "where you would prefer to be as short as possible", but after the renovation "[it] suddenly look as if [it is] no longer just from the past, but also a bit from now." The same newspaper had called it an "underground labyrinth" before.

In 2018, the station was reported to be "somewhat ready" in case a new East–West line was planned. This would make Weesperplein be a station where travellers could connect from one line to the other. Weesperplein was the fifth most used station of the Amsterdam Metro in 2018 with 36373 passengers per day, behind Amsterdam Centraal, Amsterdam Zuid, Amsterdam Amstel station and Amsterdam Bijlmer.

Artwork 

While artists were invited by officials to create artwork for most stations, Weesperplein and Bijlmer station had a public competition, where all Dutch artists were allowed to send their ideas. Of the 198 submissions, three were selected to be placed in Weesperplein.

Luchtspiegelingen of Matthijs van Dam has 12 panels showing Weesperstraat and Sarphatistraat seen from below, with roads, cars and clouds, as if one "could look up through the ceiling". The panels were placed on the ceiling of the platform in 1977, but were removed in 2010 due to fire safety measures. The panels were installed back eight years later in 2018, on the ceiling of the station hall. Verplaatsing of Charles Bergmans is ten square pieces of hard rocks. Located on the station hall, travelers could sit on them, which made their surfaces smooth and shiny over the years. Signatuur van de anonieme arbeider by Pieter Engels is three bronze beams forming the letter A. The beams symbolize the three groups that made the metro possible: Amsterdam, contractors and workers (Dutch: Amsterdam, aannemer en arbeider).

Services 
The station is served by metro lines 51, 53 and 54. North-bound, all three lines use the same track and end at Amsterdam Centraal. South-bound, M53 ends at Gaasperplas, while M54 ends at Gein. M51 used to serve the Amstelveen suburb by heading south after Amsterdam Zuid station and end at Westwijk. The section after Zuid was closed in 2019 and replaced by a tramline. M51 now continues west-bound after Zuid and ends at Isolatorweg. A tram stop near the enterance of the metro station with the same name is served by tram lines 1, 7 and 19. At night, night buses N85 and N86 stop near the station.

References

Citations

Bibliography

External links 
Official website 

Amsterdam Metro stations
Railway stations opened in 1977